Arthrobacter globiformis is a Gram-positive bacterium species from the genus of Arthrobacter.

Description and Significance 
Arthrobacter globiformis was first discovered  by H. J. Conn in 1928. This bacteria was initially found in large quantities in various types of soil. They start as Gram-negative rods before becoming Gram-positive cocci over time. They may also become large, oval-shaped cells called cystite by growing them in very high carbon to nitrogen ratio environments. These bacteria have cell walls that contain polysaccharides (with monomers glucose, galactose, and rhamnose), peptidoglycan, and phosphorus. They may also have flagella as well. Notably, A. globiformis and its antigens and proteins are commercially available for use in research, food production, biodegradation, and water/wastewater treatment.

Metabolism 
A. globiformis can break down substances in the soil such as agricultural chemicals, chromium, etc. They are primarily aerobic, but they can survive anaerobically using lactate, acetate, and ethanol producing fermentation for growth. Most are heterotrophic, meaning they cannot produce their own food. The choline oxidase activity of A. globiformis has been extensively characterized and is important for the production of glycine betaine, one of the few soluble osmotic regulators used by most cells.

Genome and Genetics 
The complete genome of A. globiformis has been sequenced using whole-genome shotgun sequencing. The genomes of three strains are available for public use. The genome is approximately 4.89 million base pairs long, containing 4305 proteins and a 66.1% GC content. Two major phylogenetic clades exist within the Arthrobacter genus, the A. globiformis/A. citreus group and the A. nicotianae group. These two clades differ mainly in their peptidoglycan structure, teichoic acid content, and lipid composition.

Further reading

References

External links
Type strain of Arthrobacter globiformis at BacDive -  the Bacterial Diversity Metadatabase

Bacteria described in 1947

Bacteria described in 1928
Micrococcaceae